MovieStop was a retailer of new and used movies and related merchandise. It was founded in 2004 as a division of GameStop. GameStop spun off MovieStop to private owners in 2012. In November 2014 MovieStop was purchased by Draw Another Circle LLC, the parent company of Hastings Entertainment. The company website was folded into GoHastings.com the next year. As of November 2014, MovieStop operated 44 stores in 10 U.S. states. All stores were closed by October 31, 2016 as part of Hastings' liquidation.

References

External links
 Moviestop official website

GameStop
Retail companies of the United States
American companies established in 2004
Retail companies established in 2004
Retail companies disestablished in 2016
2012 mergers and acquisitions
2014 mergers and acquisitions